Bryan Reynolds (born 1965), Claire Trevor Professor and Chancellor's Professor at the University of California-Irvine, is an American critical theorist, performance theorist, and Shakespeare scholar who developed the combined sociopolitical theory, performance aesthetics, and research methodology known as transversal poetics. He is also a playwright, director, performer, and cofounder of the Transversal Theater Company, an Amsterdam-based collective of American and European artists, which has produced a number of his works. Reynolds received his bachelor's degree in English Literature at the University of California, Berkeley, and his master's and doctoral degrees in English and American Literature and Language at Harvard University. He has been a Professor of Drama at the University of California, Irvine since 1998. He has held visiting professorships at the University of London-Drama, the University of Amsterdam-Theater Studies, Utrecht University-Theater Studies, University of Cologne-American Studies, Johann Wolfgang Goethe University Frankfurt am Main-American Studies, University College Utrecht-Arts and Humanities, the University of California, San Diego-Theatre, Literature, Cognitive Science, the American University of Beirut-English, University of Tsukuba-Humanities and Social Sciences, University of Nairobi-Department of Literature, Alpen-Adria-Universität Klagenfurt-Communications, University of Lorraine-Arts, Sciences, & Business Management, INSEEC Business School (L'Institut des hautes études économiques et commerciales)-Marketing, Paris, Bordeaux, Lyon; and he has taught at Deleuze Camp at Schloss Wahn, University of Cologne, Germany, and the Grotowski Institute in Wrocław, Poland, among other academic and performing arts institutions. Reynolds is also a regular contributor to Freeskier Magazine, where he publishes articles  from his ongoing research on extreme sports.

Early life
Born in New York City to Donna Reynolds, a VP of marketing at General Foods, and Donald Reynolds, a VC, Reynolds’ family moved from the Upper East Side to the Westchester County suburb of Scarsdale when he was a toddler. He attended Heathcote Elementary School, where he played soccer for the famed Heathcote Hornets through 8th grade, which was coached by New York Cosmos first general manager Clive Toye. He was also an avid skate boarder, BMXer, and skier, which informs his research on action sports. Not an enthusiastic student, Reynolds was encouraged to leave Scarsdale High School for the more disciplinary Archbishop Stepinac High School in White Plains. Reynolds returned to Scarsdale for his junior and senior years, where he joined a special program, called CORE, for students who had difficulties making it to class. Reynolds graduated in 1983 with a D average. His pursuit of a career racing motorcycle motocross brought him out to San Diego in 1985, where he attended Grossmont Community College. From there, he attended the University of California, Berkeley for his BA, and then Harvard University for his MA and PhD.

Critical works

"The Devil's House, 'or worse': Transversal Power and Antitheatrical Discourse in Early Modern England" (1997)

"The Devil's House, 'or worse'" is the first published text for Reynolds' transversal theory. In this article, transversal theory is delineated through an analysis of early modern English theater, both on the public stage and as in social performances in society at large. The article argues for the power of theater to simultaneously alter subjectivity and social identity as well as the political, economic, and social conditions under which they operate. Using spatial and temporal models for both abstract and material relations within and between individuals and groups, as well as in relation to things, transversal theory explains changes in human cognition, perspective, and experience, particularly those that move subjectivity away from habit, singularity, and stasis.

Becoming Criminal: Transversal Performance and Cultural Dissidence in Early Modern England (2002)

Becoming Criminal shows how the dissident activities and idiosyncratic languages of gypsies, rogues, vagabonds, and cutpurses interacted with normative society and culture. Reynolds argues that the real and imaginary "criminal culture" on the streets and in popular minds has been overlooked or misunderstood by scholars. He traces the effect of criminal culture to its emergence in the 16th century, when this community related daily with dominant aspects of English ideology and culture and modeled its own cultural characteristics in response to the conventions of the time. According to Reynolds, their behavior and thought is most evident in the period's commercial literature, such as in pamphlet literature and the works of Shakespeare, Jonson, Fletcher, and Brome, and in its material and symbolic relationships to the public theatre.

Performing Transversally: Reimagining Shakespeare and the Critical Future (2003)

Reynolds' transversal poetics project, expanded from his early works, is used in Performing Transversally to discuss historical and contemporary examples. He discusses the applicability of the critical concept, ranging from the sociology of Erving Goffman to the feminism and psychoanalytics of Julia Kristeva to the dramatic and theatrical criticism of Antonin Artaud and Herbert Blau. Performing Transversally navigates the ever-increasing cultural cartography of Shakespace, a term invented by Reynolds and Donald Hedrick in Shakespeare Without Class: Misappropriations of Cultural Capital, to designate past, present, and future Shakespeare influenced spaces of text, performance, and culture. Throughout the book, Reynolds emphasizes the importance of accountability, whether in the classroom, in academic research, on the stage or screen, or in everyday lives.

Transversal Enterprises in the Drama of Shakespeare and his Contemporaries: Fugitive Explorations (2006)

In Transversal Enterprises, with a number of collaborators, Reynolds analyzes plays by early modern English dramatists in the context of shifts in English history. He relates transversal poetics to other academic disciplines, including science and theology, to explore a transformation in views on space and place in relation to subjectivity and consciousness. Witches, werewolves, occultists, academicians, transvestites, baboons, moors, and gypsies, among other creatures, all reflect, for Reynolds, a metamorphic and intersubjective phenomenology for which art or artifice is requisite.

Transversal Subjects: From Montaigne to Deleuze after Derrida (2009)

Transversal Subjects traces the genealogy of Transversal Poetics from discourses on human rights, compassion, and psychopathology in the work of Montaigne and Rousseau through Husserl, Arendt, Baudrillard, Agamben, Habermas, Rancière, and others. In so doing, Reynolds makes the case that subjectivity is an emergent, shifting, and mobile phenomenon that is transversal to the subject. This allows access to affecters and enablers of transversal processes that work to empower individuals and groups in their comprehension and experience of themselves, others, and the world.

Intermedial Theater: Performance Philosophy, Transversal Poetics, and the Future of Affect (2017).

In this book, Reynolds and his collaborators explore relationships between intermedial theater, consciousness, memory, objects, subjectivity, and affect through productive engagement with the performance aesthetics, socio-cognitive theory, and critical methodology of transversal poetics alongside other leading philosophical approaches to performance. Intermedial Theater offers the first sustained analysis of the work of Gilles Deleuze, Félix Guattari, Jean Baudrillard, and Friedrich Nietzsche in relation to the contemporary European theater of Jan Lauwers and Needcompany, Romeo Castellucci and Socìetas Raffaello Sanzio, Thomas Ostermeier, Rodrigo García and La Carnicería Teatro, and the Transversal Theater Company. It connects contemporary uses of objects, simulacra, and technologies in both posthumanist discourse and postdramatic theater to the transhistorically and culturally mediating power of Shakespeare as a means by which to discuss the affective impact of intermedial theater on today's audiences.

Excess & Joy: Philosophical Transversations (2022).

In Excess & Joy, Reynolds and Los Angeles Playwright, Director, and Artistic Director of Padua Playwrights Guy Zimmerman team up to explore questions paramount to the fields of performance studies, philosophy, and cultural studies, as well as to life in general. In attempting to answer crucial questions such as how do we know who we are, is there a you there, do we have free will, why do we like some things more than others, and where does value come from, Reynolds and Zimmerman explain theories fundamental to the philosophers Jacques Derrida, George Bataille, and Gilles Deleuze as they also explain the combined socio-cognitive theory, performance aesthetics, and research methodology of transversal poetics.

The Transversality of Gregory de la Haba: The Future of Art and Myth are Upon Us (2022).

In The Transversality of Gregory de la Haba: The Future of Art and Myth are Upon Us, Reynolds situates the oeuvre of iconic New York multimedia artist Gregory de la Haba within and beyond the dynamic history of structural anthropology, myth theory, and post-structuralist philosophy. Reynolds demonstrates, à la the radical thought of Gilles Deleuze and Félix Guattari, how de la Haba performs Claude Levi-Strauss’ theory of the bricoleur – an ingenious craftsman who fabricates wonders from everyday materials – to the tune of Jacques Derrida’s philosophy of deconstruction – which highlights the arbitrary yet nevertheless emergent quality of wonder – to create a myth-making body of work that offers a profoundly ironic critique of the state of humanity even while it reminds us of the liberatory, generative, and metamorphic powers of artistic expression.

Honours
2020: Tor Vergata Award, Railroad (director/playwright), 28th Annual Festival Internazionale del Teatro Patologico, Rome, Italy.
2016: Awarded endowed chair, "Claire Trevor Professor," University of California, Irvine.
2014: Research Award, International Centre for Muslim and non-Muslim Understanding (MnM), University of South Australia.
2014: Invitation Fellowship Award, Japan Society for the Promotion of Science.
2014: Distinguished Visiting Scholar, American University of Beirut, Lebanon.
2012: Awarded title of "Chancellor's Professor" by the University of California.
2008: Silver Award: Experimental Web Site, 5th Annual Pcom Creative Awards (Creative Director, Bryan Reynolds; Designer/Illustrator/Animator/Programmer, Alex Sacui).
2006: Honored as a Distinguished Alumnus of Scarsdale High School, New York.
2005: Awarded title of "Chancellor's Fellow" by the University of California.
2004: Honored by the University of Alabama's Hudson Strode Program in Renaissance Studies, directed by Gary Taylor, as "one of the six most brilliant Renaissance scholars in the world under 40," "for work on 'transversal poetics.'"
2001-2002: Distinguished Early-Career Faculty Award for Teaching, University of California, Irvine.

Publications & theater works

Books written
Excess & Joy: Philosophical Transversations, with Guy Zimmerman (San Francisco: PCP Press, 2022).
The Transversality of Gregory de la Haba: The Future of Art and Myth are Upon Us (San Francisco: PCP Press, 2022).
Intermedial Theater: Performance Philosophy, Transversal Poetics, and the Future of Affect (London: Palgrave Macmillan, 2017).
Transversal Subjects: From Montaigne to Deleuze after Derrida (London: Palgrave Macmillan, 2009).
Transversal Enterprises in the Drama of Shakespeare and his Contemporaries: Fugitive Explorations (London: Palgrave Macmillan, 2006).
Performing Transversally: Reimagining Shakespeare and the Critical Future (New York: Palgrave Macmillan, 2003).
Becoming Criminal: Transversal Performance and Cultural Dissidence in Early Modern England (Baltimore: Johns Hopkins University Press, 2002).

Books edited
Performance Studies: Key Words, Concepts and Theories, Editor (Houndmills, Basingstoke, UK: Palgrave Macmillan, 2014).
The Return of Theory in Early Modern English Studies, Volume II, Co-Editor, with Paul Cefalu and Gary Kuchar (Houndmills, Basingstoke, UK: Palgrave Macmillan, 2014).
The Return of Theory in Early Modern English Studies: Tarrying with the Subjunctive, Co-Editor, with Paul Cefalu (Houndmills, Basingstoke, UK: Palgrave Macmillan, 2011).
Critical Responses to Kiran Desai, Co-Editor, with Sunita Sinha (New Delhi, India: Atlantic Publishers 2009).
Rematerializing Shakespeare: Authority and Representation on the Early Modern English Stage, Co-Editor, with William West (London: Palgrave Macmillan, 2005).
Shakespeare Without Class: Misappropriations of Cultural Capital, Co-Editor, with Donald Hedrick (New York: Palgrave Macmillan, 2000).

Plays
Unbuckled (play), Written by Bryan Reynolds, The Anthology of Contemporary Plays 2004 (Sibiu, Romania: Annual Publication of the Sibiu International Theatre Festival, 2004).
Productions: Directors Bryan Reynolds & Jef Vowell, The Flight Theatre, Hollywood, California, July 2004; Andrei Muresanu Theatre, Sfântu-Gheorghe, Romania, June 2004; Ariel Theatre, Târgu Mureş, Romania, June 2004; The National Theatre, Cluj, Romania, June 2004; Sibiu International Theatre Festival, Romania, May–June https://web.archive.org/web/20081210180200/http://www.sibfest.ro/FITS.html
 Woof, Daddy (play), Written by Bryan Reynolds.
Productions:  Director Amanda McRaven, Linhart Theater, New York City, August 2007. Director Amanda McRaven, Exit Theatre, San Francisco, September 2006. Director Eli Simon: Rampa-Teatr Na Targówku, Warsaw, Poland, April 2005; Teatr Polski-Malarnia, Poznan, Poland, April 2005; Teatr Kana, Szczecin, Poland, April 2005. Director Bryan Reynolds, Melkweg Theater, Amsterdam, the Netherlands, September 2008.
Railroad (play), Written by Bryan Reynolds, in Plays International (London: The Performing Arts Trust, October 2006).
Productions:  Director Robert Cohen: Sibiu International Theatre Festival, Romania, May–June 2006; The National Theatre, Cluj, Romania, May 2006. Director Bryan Reynolds, Regionteatern Blekinge-Kronoberg, Växjö, Sweden, October 2013; Director Bryan Reynolds, ED Theatre, University of Nairobi, Kenya, September 2016; Director Bryan Reynolds, Citadelle de Dinant, European Heritage Puzzle, Belgium, November 2019; Director Bryan Reynolds, 28th Annual Festival Internazionale del Teatro Patologico, Rome, Italy, May 2020 (winner Tor Vergata Award).
Blue Shade (play), Written by Bryan Reynolds, in Plays International (London: The Performing Arts Trust, October 2008) and in English and Romanian (Cluj: Babes-Bolyai University of Cluj Press, 2007).
Productions:  Director Robert Cohen: Teatr Lalek, Wrocław, Poland, June 2007; Teatr Modjeska, Legnica, Poland, June 2007; Teatr 77,  Łódź, Poland, May 2007; Divadlo DISK, Academy of Performing Arts (DAMU), Prague, Czech Republic, May 2007; Teatrul Mic, 17th Annual National Theatre Festival, Bucharest, Romania, November 2007. Director Răzvan Mureşan, The National Theatre, Cluj, Romania, April 2008 (in rep); Teatrul Tineretului, 23rd Annual Festival of Theater, Piatra Neamț, Romania, October 2008 https://web.archive.org/web/20081025072617/http://www.teatrultineretuluint.ro/programfest2008ok.html; Romanian National Theater, 18th Annual National Theater Festival, Bucharest, Romania, November 2008 https://web.archive.org/web/20111005222512/http://www.fnt.ro/en/imagine.html-32. Director Bryan Reynolds, Rozentheater, Amsterdam Fringe Festival, Netherlands, September 2009 https://web.archive.org/web/20090912101924/http://www.amsterdamfringefestival.nl/fringe/en/programme/fringe-2009/blue-shade-transversal-theater-company.aspx; Utrecht University Theater, Netherlands, September 2009; Severins-Burg-Theater, Cologne, Germany, May 2010.
Lumping in Fargo (musical), Book and Lyrics by Bryan Reynolds; Music by Michael Hooker.
Productions: Director Christopher Marshall, Los Angeles New American Music Theatre Festival, June 2008 https://web.archive.org/web/20081208095952/http://www.lafestival.org/index.php; Teatr Rozrywki, Chorzów, Poland, July 2008; and 12th International Shakespeare Festival, Gdańsk, Poland, August 2008.http://www.teatr-szekspir.gda.pl/index2.php
Director Jim Carmody, UC San Diego, Arthur Wagner Theater, November 2012.
Eve's Rapture (play), Written by Bryan Reynolds.
Productions: Director Robert Cohen, Hayworth Theatre, Los Angeles, May–June 2009.
The Green Knight (play), Book and Lyrics by Bryan Reynolds; Music by Michael Hooker.
Productions: Director Bryan Reynolds, World Premiere, 17th Annual Festivalul International de Teatru de la Sibiu, Cisnădioara Fortress, Romania, June 2010.
Macbeth, Adapted and Directed by Bryan Reynolds, Studio-T, University College Utrecht, Netherlands, September 2010.
Romeo & Juliet, Adapted and Directed by Bryan Reynolds, Studio-T, University College Utrecht, Netherlands, September 2011.
Titus Andronicus, Adapted and Directed by Bryan Reynolds, Studio-T, University College Utrecht, Netherlands, September 2012
Fractalicious! (intermedial performance), Written by Bryan Reynolds; Director Guy Zimmerman; Director of Film Michael Moshe Dahan; Principal actors Bryan Reynolds & Jessica Emmanuel (originally Kayla Emerson).
Productions: University of Amsterdam Theater, March 2012; Studio-T, Utrecht University, September 2012; University of Amsterdam Theater, September 2012; University of California, San Diego, Dance Studio 3 Theater, October 2012; University of California, Davis, Lab A Theater, November 2012; University of California, Irvine, xMPL Theater, Contemporary Arts Center, April 2013; University of California, San Diego, Calit2 Theater, April 2013; University of California, Los Angeles, Royce Hall, May 2013; 2014 Interferences Festival, Hungarian State Theatre of Cluj, Cluj-Napoca, Romania, December 2014; Zoukak Studio, Beirut, Lebanon, May 2015.
Bzzap! (play), Directed by Bryan Reynolds, Written by Robert Cohen, University of Amsterdam Theater, Netherlands, August 2014.
Nabi Saleh (musical), Written and Directed by Bryan Reynolds, Music by Abed Hathout, a collaboration between Transversal Theater and the Jenin Freedom Theatre, workshop performance, Cinema Jenin Theatre, film presentation, Nabi Saleh, March 2015.
My Dinner With You (play), Directed by Bryan Reynolds, Written by Niels Horeman, Roode Bioscoop Theater, Amsterdam Fringe Festival, Netherlands, September 2017.
No Erasure (dance theater/play), Co-Directed & Co-Written with Jesús E. López Vargas, a collaboration between Transversal Theater and Dawar Arts, Jesuit Theater, Cairo, Egypt, April 2021.
Curie, Curie (dance theater/play), Written and Directed by Bryan Reynolds, Choreography by Jessica Dunn, University of California, Irvine, xMPL Theater, Contemporary Arts Center, October 2021; Teatr STUDIO, Palace of Culture, Warsaw, Poland, January 2022.
Interview the Dead (performance art/theater), Created and Directed by Bryan Reynolds, Apartment Theater, Commodore Building, Leon Street, Hamra and at the American University of Beirut, Beirut, Lebanon, December 2021; Eugène Millon Theatre, Paris, France, July 2022); Mezrab Theater, Amsterdam, Netherlands, September 2022.
Anatomy of a Home (theater), Directed by Bryan Reynolds, Written by Raffi Feghali, Theater Bellevue, Amsterdam Fringe Festival, Amsterdam, Netherlands, September 2022; Theater Podium Mozaïek, International Storytelling Festival Amsterdam, Netherlands, November 2022; Little Theater, UC Irvine, January 2023; Thiemeloods Theater, Nijmegen, Netherlands, March 2023.
After Images, or Marie Curie Remembers (dance theater/play), Written and Directed by Bryan Reynolds, Choreography by Jessica Dunn, Théâtre de Sax du Centre Culturel de Dinant, Dinant, Belgium, September 2022; University Theater, University of Amsterdam, Netherlands, September 2022.
The Passage (dance theater/play), Written and Directed by Bryan Reynolds, Choreography by Jessica Dunn, University of California, Irvine, xMPL Theater, Contemporary Arts Center, October 2022.

Selected articles
"The Devil's House, 'or worse': Transversal Power and Antitheatrical Discourse in Early Modern England," Theatre Journal 49:2 (May 1997).
"The Transversality of Michel de Certeau: Foucault's Panoptic Discourse and the Cartographic Impulse," with Joseph Fitzpatrick in Diacritics 29:3 (Fall 1999).
"The Making of Authorships: Transversal Navigation in the Wake of Hamlet, Robert Wilson, Wolfgang Wiens, and Shakespace," with D.J. Hopkins, in Shakespeare After Mass Media, Ed. Richard Burt (New York: Palgrave Macmillan, 2002).
"The Reckoning of Moll Cutpurse: A Transversal Enterprise," with Janna Segal, Rogues and Early Modern English Culture, Eds. Craig Dionne and Steve Mentz (Ann Arbor: University of Michigan Press, 2004).
"Transversal Poetics and Fugitive Explorations: Subject Performance, Early Modern English Theatre, and Macbeth," in Early Theatre 7:2 (2004).
"EuroShakespace and the Witness-Function: Convergences of History, Memory, and Affective Presence," in Multicultural Shakespeare: Translation, Appropriation, Performance vol. 4, Ed. Lawrence Gunter (University of Łódź Press, 2007).
"Transversal Acting," with Chris Marshall in Semiotic Review of Books 17.1 (2007).
"From Homo Academicus to Poeta Publicus: Celebrity and Transversal Knowledge in Robert Greene's Friar Bacon and Friar Bungay (c. 1589)," with Henry Turner, Writing Robert Greene: New Essays on England's First Professional Writer, Eds. Edward Gieskes and Kirk Melnikoff (Hampshire, UK: Ashgate Press, 2008). 
"Theater of Immediacy, Transversal Poetics," with Mark LeVine, Performance Studies: Key Words, Concepts and Theories, Editor Bryan Reynolds (Houndmills, Basingstoke, UK: Palgrave Macmillan, 2014); about Mohamed Bouazizi and performance activism during the 2011 revolutions in Tunisia and Egypt.
"No Brain, No Gain: The Mind-Body Fusion of The Backcountry Shredder," Freeskier Magazine 19:2 (2017)..
"Skiing for Life: A Miracle Sport for Generative Happiness," Freeskier Magazine 20:2 (2017)..
"Positive Visualization: From Believing to Performing," Freeskier Magazine May 6, 2019..
"Every skier is an artist: Creativity, stoke and brain network dynamics," Freeskier Magazine January 21, 2020..

Reviews of his works
Shakespeare Without Class
Worthen, W.B. Review of Hedrick and Reynolds, Shakespeare Without Class. "Recent Studies in Tudor and Stuart Drama," Studies in English Literature. 42.2 (2002) 399–448.
Taylor, Mark. Review of Hedrick and Reynolds, Shakespeare Without Class. Renaissance Quarterly 56:3 (Autumn 2003): 936–39.
Becoming Criminal
Beier, A.L. Review of Reynolds, Becoming Criminal. Modern Philology. (May 2005) 102:4: 550–7.
CHOICE: Current Reviews for Academic Libraries. Review of Reynolds, Becoming Criminal. August 2006 v43 i11-12 p1995(1).
Cohen, Stephen. Review of Reynolds, Becoming Criminal. The Sixteenth Century Journal. 35:2 (Summer 2004): 576–577.
Cunningham, Karen. Review of Reynolds, Becoming Criminal. Theatre Survey, 45:1 (May 2004): 149–151.

Hodgdon, Barbara. Review of Reynolds, Becoming Criminal. Studies in English Literature. 43:2 (Spring 2003): 501–502.
Steve Mentz, Review of Reynolds, Becoming Criminal. CLIO: A Journal of Literature, History, and the Philosophy of History. 33:1 (Fall 2003 ): 73–77.
--- Review of Reynolds, Becoming Criminal. The Shakespeare Newsletter (Spring 2003): 9–10.
Mowry, Melissa. Review of Reynolds, Becoming Criminal. Journal of British Studies. January 2005 v44 i1 p178(9).
Nesvet, Rebecca. Review of Reynolds, Becoming Criminal. EMLS 2004.
Pollard, Tanya. Review of Reynolds, Becoming Criminal. Renaissance Quarterly. 57:2 (Summer 2004): 750–51.
Review of Reynolds, Becoming Criminal. Reference & Research Book News. February 2004 v19 i1 p237(1).
Performing Transversally
Berek, Peter. Review of Reynolds, Performing Transversally. Renaissance Quarterly. 57:4 (2004), 1527–29.
Cartelli, Thomas. Review of Reynolds, Performing Transversally. Theatre Journal. May 2005 v57 i2 p329(3).
Rematerializing Shakespeare
Boehrer, Bruce. Review of Reynolds and William West Ed., Rematerializing Shakespeare in Recent Studies in Tudor and Stuart Drama, SEL: Studies in English Literature 1500–190047.2 (2007) 491-550: 525–528.
Transversal Enterprises
Cohen, Adam Max. Review of Reynolds, Transversal Enterprises. Early Theatre, Vol. 11: 1 (2008).
Engel, William E. Review of Reynolds, Transversal Enterprises. "A Rich Harvest: Recent Books on Shakespeare." Sewanee Review, Volume 117, Number 4, Fall 2009, pp. 655–665.
Cefalu, Paul. Review of Reynolds, Transversal Enterprises. Shakespeare Quarterly. 58.2 (2007) 257–260.
Hansen, Matthew C., Review of Reynolds, Transversal Enterprises. The Year's Work in English Studies. 87:1 (2008) 336–506.
Hawkes, David. Review of Reynolds, Transversal Enterprises. Theatre Survey. 50:1 (2009), 141–143.
Transversal Subjects
Oliver Davis, Review of Reynolds, Transversal Subjects. French Studies, Volume 64, Issue 2: 228-229 .
Other works
Guy Zimmerman, "Bryan Reynolds Gets Close In Transversal Theater Company's Fractalicious! TheatreForum Issue 42 (2013).
Sherman, Donovan. Review of Blue Shade. Theatre Journal. Vol. 60.1 (March 2008): 137-9.
Rothkopf, Joshua. Review of Woof, Daddy Time Out New York

Portwood, Jerry. Review of Woof, Daddy Backstage
Lester, Rob. Review of Woof, Daddy Edge New York
Lo, Jeffrey. Review of Blue Shade New University
Nathaniel Eaton. Review of Woof, Daddy San Francisco Weekly
Fernie, Ewan. "Terrible Action: Recent Criticism and Questions of Agency." Shakespeare. Volume 2, Number 01 / June 2006.
Genosko, Gary. Felix Guattari: An Aberrant Introduction. 57–9. (Continuum Press, 2002).
Guibbory, Achsah. "Recent Studies in the English Renaissance." Studies in English Literature, Vol. 45, 2005.
Lanier, Douglas. "Shakespeare and Cultural Studies: An Overview," Shakespeare. 2:2 December 2006).
Munro, Lucy. The Year's Work in English Studies. 81:1 (Oxford University Press, 2006).
McManus, Clare. The Year's Work in English Studies. 81:1 (Oxford University Press, 2006).
Nesvet, Rebecca. "Vagabonds, Players and Shakespeare," Literature Compass. 1:1 (January 2003 - December 2004).
Kirol, Agata. Review of Lumping in Fargo Gazeta Wyborcza Trójmiasto
Rudziński, Łukasz. Review of Lumping in Fargo Polski Wortal Teatralny
Lehnhof, Kent. Review of Lumping in Fargo Borrowers and Lenders: The Journal of Shakespeare and Appropriation 3:2 (2008).

Marianne Fritz. Review of Eve's Rapture SoCal "EVES RAPTURE ROCKS, FORSOOTH!".
Deborah Klugman. Review of Eve's Rapture LA Weekly "GO!".
Kyle Moore. Review of Eve's Rapture The Tolucan Times "Genesis: Reloaded".
Reyna. Review of Eve's Rapture Boys Buzz "Eve's Rapture Steals Reyna's Heart".
James A. Mackenzie, "The Transversal Power of Collaboration in the Production of Critical Theory," Humanity Journal (2010) .
Interviews
In KPFK Pacifica, Free Speech TV
In Multicultural Shakespeare
In Check Uit Amsterdam
In Curtain Rising Magazine
In OC Weekly

References

External links
Official website
Bryan Reynolds at UCI Drama

1965 births
American literary critics
Living people
University of California, Berkeley alumni
Harvard University alumni
Shakespearean scholars
University of California, Irvine faculty
People from Scarsdale, New York
20th-century American dramatists and playwrights
Scarsdale High School alumni